Marco Carraro (born 9 January 1998) is an Italian footballer who plays for  club Crotone on loan from Atalanta as a midfielder.

Club career

Inter Milan

Loan to Pescara 
On 1 July 2017, Carraro was signed by Serie B side Pescara on a season-long loan deal. On 6 August, Carraro made his professional debut for Pescara in a 5–3 home win over Triestina in the second round of Coppa Italia, he was replaced by Mamadou Coulibaly in the 46th minute. On 8 September, Carraro made his Serie B debut for Pescara, as a substitute replacing Mattia Proietti in the 76th minute of a 3–3 home draw against Frosinone. On 28 October, Carraro played his first match as a starter for Pescara, a 3–0 home defeat against Brescia, he was replaced by Luca Valzania in the 68th minute. On 3 November he played his first entire match for Pescara, a 2–2 home draw against Palermo. Carraro ended his season-long loan to Pescara with 24 appearances and 1 assist.

Atalanta 
On 30 June 2018, Carraro was transferred to Serie A team Atalanta, however Inter Milan reserved the right to buy him back.

Loan to Foggia and Perugia 
On 23 July 2018, Carraro was signed by Serie B club Foggia on a season-long loan deal. On 5 August he made his debut for Foggia in a 3–1 home defeat against Catania in the second round of Coppa Italia, he played the entire match. On 26 August he made his Serie B debut for Foggia in a 4–2 home win over Carpi, he played the entire match. In January 2019, Carraro was re-called to Atalanta leaving Foggia with 15 appearances, including 12 as a starter and 1 assist.

On 24 January 2019, Carraro was loaned to Serie B club Perugia on a 6-month loan deal.  On 27 February he made his debut for the club in a 3–2 away win over Venezia, he played the entire match. On 30 March he scored his first professional goal in the 49th minute of a 3–1 home win over Livorno. Carraro ended his 6-moth loan to Perugia with 12 appearances, all as a starter, and 1 goal.

Loan to Perugia 
On 15 July 2019, Carraro returned to Perugia with a season-long loan deal. On 11 August he made his season debut in a 1–0 home win over Triestina in the second round of Coppa Italia, he played the entire match. Two weeks later, on 25 August he made his league debut for the club, a 2–1 home win over ChievoVerona, he played against the entire match.

Loan to Frosinone 
On 5 October 2020 he was loaned to Frosinone in Serie B.

Loan to Cosenza 
On 18 August 2021, he moved on loan to Cosenza.

Loan to Crotone 
On 1 September 2022, Carraro joined Crotone on loan with a conditional obligation to buy.

International career 
Carraro represented Italy at Under-15, Under16 and Under20 level. On 30 April 2013 he made his debut at U-15 level in a 0–0 home draw against United States U15, he was replaced by Dario Scudieri in the 31st minute. On 30 August 2013, Carraro made his debut at U-16 level as a substitute replacing Lorenzo Grossi in the 41st minute of a 3–0 home win over Qatar U17. On 5 October 2017 he made his debut at U-20 level as a substitute replacing Gaetano Castrovilli in the 81st minute of a 5–1 home defeat against England U20. On 10 October, Carraro played his first match as a starter in Italy U-20, a 4–2 away defeat against Portugal U20, he was replaced by Giulio Maggiore in the 68th minute.

He made his debut with the Italy U21 on 6 September 2019, in a friendly match won 4–0 against Moldova.

Career statistics

Club

Honours

Club 
Inter Primavera

 Campionato Nazionale Primavera: 2016–17

References

External links 
 

Living people
1998 births
Sportspeople from the Metropolitan City of Venice
Association football midfielders
Italian footballers
Italy youth international footballers
Inter Milan players
Delfino Pescara 1936 players
Atalanta B.C. players
Calcio Foggia 1920 players
A.C. Perugia Calcio players
Frosinone Calcio players
Cosenza Calcio players
F.C. Crotone players
Serie B players
People from Dolo
Footballers from Veneto